The Windshield Wiper is a 2021 Spanish-American computer-cel adult animated short film directed and co-produced by Alberto Mielgo alongside  Leo Sánchez. The film won the award for Best Animated Short Film at the 94th Academy Awards.

Release
The film had its premiere during the Cannes Film Festival 2021 at the Directors' Fortnight and release on The Animation Showcase a private industry streaming platform.

Plot 
Inside a cafe while smoking a whole pack of cigarettes, a man poses an ambitious question: "What is Love?". A collection of vignettes and situations will lead the man to the desired conclusion.

Accolades 
Since its launch, the film has been selected in various festivals around the world:

References

External links 
 The Windshield Wiper - Full Film on Youtube
 Official Trailer on Vimeo
 

2021 films
American adult animated films
2021 animated films
American animated short films
Spanish animated short films
Best Animated Short Academy Award winners
2020s Romanian-language films
2020s American films